Theodore Case Sound Test: Gus Visser and his Singing Duck, also known as Gus Visser and His Singing Duck, is a 1925 American short musical comedy film starring vaudeville performer Gus Visser. The short is an early sound film, directed by Theodore Case while perfecting his variable density sound-on-film process. Case began working on his sound film process at the Case Research Lab in Auburn, New York, in 1921.

In 2002, the film was selected for the National Film Registry at the Library of Congress as a historically important American film. A print of the film is preserved at the George Eastman House.

History
From 1921 to 1924, Case provided Lee De Forest with inventions of the Case Research Lab for use as improvements in De Forest's Phonofilm system, but had a falling-out with De Forest after failing to be credited for those inventions, such as the AEO Light, that made De Forest's system workable. From 1916 to 1927, Earl I. Sponable worked for Case. After Case sold his system in July 1926 to William Fox—who renamed the Case system Fox Movietone—Sponable went to work for Fox Movietone.

Other test films by Case in his process include Miss Manila Martin and Her Pet Squirrel (1921), Bird in a Cage (1923), Madame Fifi (1925), and Chinese Variety Performer with a Ukelele (1925) and Gallagher and Shean (1925), all recorded in a sparse studio located on the second floor of the Case estate carriage house in Auburn, New York, now a museum. Most of Case's test films were destroyed in a fire in a storage building in the 1950s, though a dozen or so have survived to this day. Some of those films are at the Library of Congress, George Eastman House, and the Case Research Lab Museum.

Overview

The film depicts Visser singing the song "Ma, He's Making Eyes at Me" while holding a duck. The duck quacks each time the word "Ma" is said, sounding as if she is saying "Ma". The film was shot on May 12, 1925 in Case's sound studio at his home in Auburn, New York.

There are as many as three separate takes of Visser's act that exist. The film was shown in June 1925 at the Exposition of Progress in Auburn. Visser (b. January 21, 1894, Netherlands; d. September 1967, North Bergen, New Jersey) is listed as an entertainer in the Auburn City Directory in the early 1920s. However, his name disappears from the directory by the mid-1920s and there is as yet no further information known of Visser, nor of his duck.

Equipment 
The material and equipment used for shooting the video can be found at The Cayuga Museum of History and Art.

See also
List of films preserved in the United States National Film Registry

References

External links

Gus Visser and His Singing Duck essay by Scott Simmon on the National Film Registry website 
Gus Visser and His Singing Duck essay by Daniel Eagan in America's Film Legacy: The Authoritative Guide to the Landmark Movies in the National Film Registry, A&C Black, 2010 , pages 114-115 

, accessed March 25, 2009

1925 films
1920s musical comedy films
1925 short films
American musical comedy films
American black-and-white films
Film sound production
United States National Film Registry films
American silent short films
1925 comedy films
Early sound films
1920s English-language films
1920s American films
Silent American comedy films